The Las Vegas Grammar School on Washington and D Streets in Las Vegas, Nevada, also known as the Westside School, Branch No. 1, Las Vegas Grammar School, and Las Vegas Grammar School Branch No. 1, is a Registered Historic Place in Nevada.  It is Las Vegas’ oldest remaining schoolhouse and currently houses KCEP-FM, a community center and the Economic Opportunity Board.

History 
Helen J. Stewart donated land in 1922 for the school and it was built in 1923. It was the first public school attended
by Native American students from the Paiute Indian Colony.

The building was added to the National Register of Historic Places on April 2, 1979.

See also
Las Vegas Grammar School (Las Vegas Boulevard, Las Vegas, Nevada), also historic and NRHP-listed

References

Sources 
Las Vegas web site
NRHP

External links

Westside School (from the UNLV Architecture Studies Library)

National Register of Historic Places in Las Vegas
Defunct schools in Nevada
Schools in Las Vegas
Nevada State Register of Historic Places
School buildings on the National Register of Historic Places in Nevada
1923 establishments in Nevada
School buildings completed in 1923